Sonchus hydrophilus is a species of flowering plant in the family Asteraceae which is native to Australia and New Guinea. It was first described in 1965 by Loutfy Boulos.

Its conservatation status in the Northern Territory is "data deficient".

References

External links
Sonchus hydrophilus occurrence data from GBIF

Plants described in 1965
hydrophilus
Flora of Australia